Amsterdam Lelylaan is a railway, metro, tram and bus station in west Amsterdam. It is served by trains of the Nederlandse Spoorwegen and metros of the GVB. The station opened on 1 June 1986. It is located on the Amsterdam-Schiphol railway, a few km south of Amsterdam Sloterdijk railway station. South of this station, trains turn west towards Schiphol railway station, while metros turn east towards Amsterdam Zuid railway station. The station is located in the Amsterdam borough of Slotervaart, on a long viaduct spanning three roads.

History

Construction
The station was built in 1986 when a link was constructed from Amsterdam Centraal to Schiphol Airport. The new line reduced journey time from Centraal Station and Schiphol to as little as 16 minutes. The other stations built on this line were Amsterdam Sloterdijk (rebuilt) and Amsterdam De Vlugtlaan. De Vlugtlaan was closed in May 2000 to enable construction of the Hemboog, which enabled direct connections to Zaandam and beyond since 2003.

Nederlandse Spoorwegen
For its first 10 years, Intercity trains called at Lelylaan station, providing direct services to places as far away as Brussels, Berlin and Leeuwarden. From 1996 to 2006, only stopping trains called at this station. In 2006 an intercity service Schiphol-Amsterdam Centraal-Lelystad was introduced, which also calls at Lelylaan. Since December 2016, only stopping trains call at the station once again.

GVB
The metro platform is an island platform, which has a direct link onto GVB tram lines 1 and 17. The main entrance is further south. In the early 2000s the stairs to the tram lines were closed off with fences to counter fare evasion, which was running high, with people running off the train and straight onto a tram. Early 2007 the gates were opened again, but only during daytime.

Until 1988 the only tram here had been the 1, but in that year the 17 was extended from Surinameplein to Osdorp. The two lines follow different routes into the city centre. In 1997 GVB opened its fourth metro line, the 50 (Isolatorweg - Gein).

The station is also served by a bus station.

Train services
, the following train services call at this station:
Local Sprinter services Leiden - Hoofddorp - Schiphol - Zaandam - Hoorn Kersenboogerd
Local Sprinter services The Hague - Leiden - Schiphol - Amsterdam - Weesp - Almere - Lelystad - Zwolle
Local Sprinter services Hoofddorp - Schiphol - Amsterdam - Hilversum - Amersfoort Vathorst

Tram services
The current tram situation has its origin in December 2001. The first tram in this area was in 1954, when line 1 ran to Slotermeer. It was extended in 1962. In 1988 line 17 was extended to Osdorp as well, after it used to terminate at Surinameplein 1 km east of Lelylaan. Line 1 terminated at Dijkgraafplein and line 17 terminated at the Osdorpplein, near Meer en Vaart. In 2001 the current service pattern came into operation.

Bus services

These services are operated by GVB.

62 Station Lelylaan - Slotervaart - Hoofddorpplein - Haarlemmermeer - Stadionplein - VU - Zuid - Buitenveldert - RAI - Station Amstel
63 Station Lelylaan - Osdorp, Meer en Vaart - Osdorper Ban - Osdorp de Aker

This service is operated by Connexxion.

195 Station Lelylaan - Sloten - Badhoevedorp - Hoofddorp

References

External links

Lelylaan
Railway stations opened in 1986
1986 establishments in the Netherlands
Railway stations on the Westtak Ringspoorbaan
Lelylaan
Tram stops in Amsterdam
Railway stations in the Netherlands opened in the 20th century